Thimi Filipi (1 March 1926 – 1 July 1990) was an Albanian actor who was often cast in the roles of fathers, grandfathers, elders and Germans.

Life 

Thimi Filipi was born in the city of Korça in 1926. His first roles were be in non-professional acting troupes in Korça. During the Second World War he participated in partisan formations, where he worked to create partisan theaters. At the end of the war, work began at the Korça hospital. He began playing roles with the city's professional theater. In 1954, he started working as a professional actor at the "Andon Zako Çajupi" theater. His first role was in the drama, The Flower of Memory.

He went on to act in more than 30 feature and television films. His first role in cinematography will coincide with the first, entirely Albanian film, Tana, in the role of party secretary. Other roles would follow. In 1986, he received the "Aleksander Moisiu" Award.

Legacy 
For his artistic merits, on 5 August 1991, Filipi was posthumously honored with the high title "People's Artist".

Filmography 
 Pranvera s’erdhi vetëm - (1988)... Babai i Irenës
 Vrasje ne gjueti – (1987)... Xha Llazi.
 Rrethi i kujtesës – (1987)... Loro
 Tri ditë nga një jetë – (1986)... xha Shimo
 Enveri ynë – 1985
 Asgjë nuk harrohet – (1985)... Gramozi, kryetari i grupit hetimor
 Nata e parë e lirisë – (1984)... Komisari
 Kush vdes në këmbë - (1984)...Bujku
 Shirat e vjeshtës – (1984)... Ustai
 Militanti – (1984)... Babai i Visar Shundos
 Fraktura – (1983)... Gjyshi
 Apasionata - (1983)... Take Rizai babai i Mires
 Njeriu i mirë – (1982)... shoku Astrit
 Në kufi të dy legjendave – (1981)
 Si gjithë të tjerët – (1981)... usta Nashua
 Vëllezër dhe shokë – (1980)... babai i Vasos
 Shoqja nga fshati – (1980)... Shefi i bujqësisë
 Një ndodhi në port – (1980)... Petro
 Mësonjëtorja – (1979)... xha Vani
 Mysafiri – (1979)... Akrepi
 Ballë për Ballë – (1979)... Xhemal Struga
 Dollia e dasmës time - (1978)... Babai i nuses
 Njeriu me top – (1977)... Fahredini
 Gunat përmbi tela (1977)... Kapedani
 Streha e re - (1977)... Shoku Dane, Kryetari i Kooperatives
 Përballimi – (1976)... Neziri
 Nusja dhe shtetrrethimi – (1974)... xha Jani
 Yjet e netëve të gjata – (1972)... Xhandari
 I teti ne bronz – (1970)... Ballist
 Vitet e para – (1965)... Gjika, Sekretari i partisë
 Tana – (1958)... Sekretari i Partisë

References 

20th-century Albanian male actors
People from Korçë
1926 births
1990 deaths